Anarkali  is a 1953 Indian historical drama film, directed by Nandlal Jaswantlal, and written by Nasir Hussain and Hameed Butt, based on the historical legend of the Mughal emperor Jahangir (Salim). As per the legend, Jahangir revolted against his father Akbar over his love for a common girl called Anarkali.

It was the top grossing Hindi film in the year of its release - 1953. Another film on the same theme was Mughal-e-Azam, released in 1960, which turned out to be one of the biggest box office success in the history of Indian cinema and a major critical success as well.

Plot
Shahenshah Jalal-ud-din Akbar is the grandson of Babur, and the son of Humayun. He is known to have ruled over Hindustan with a humane and just heart. He knew in order to garner the support of the Hindus, he must treat them sensitively, allow them to worship freely, and in order to maintain this peace, he married Jodha Bai, a Hindu Rajput, the sister of Raja Bhagwant Das. Through this marriage they became the proud parents of Shehzada Salim (Jahangir). Akbar first met Nadira in the Anar garden, while she was awaiting the arrival of her lover. So pleased he was with her that he wanted to reward her, but she only asked for an Anar, so he ended up bestowing her with the name of 'Anarkali'. He met her the second time when she was able to revive Salim, who was seriously wounded in a war in Kabul. Once again Akbar was pleased with her, wanted to reward her, but again she turned him down. The third time she ended up annoying Akbar when she sang and danced in his court under the influence of alcohol, and he has her imprisoned. The very foundations of Akbar's palace will be shaken to the roots, and his manner of meting out justice will be put to the extreme test, when he finds out that Salim is in love with Anarkali and wants to marry her. While Akbar may have been successful to end the strife between Hindus and Muslims, but will be able to break down the wall between the rich and the poor?

Cast
 Pradeep Kumar as Shehzada Salim / Jahangir
 Bina Rai as Nadira / Anarkali
 Kuldip Kaur as Gulnar
 Ruby Mayer as Rani Jodha Bai
 S. L. Puri as Raja Man Singh
 Manmohan Krishna as Parvez 
 Mubarak as Shahenshah Akbar

Soundtrack
The composer Vasant Prakash was initially appointed as the music director of this film, but fell out with the film producer S. Mukerji after having recorded just one song with Geeta Dutt. Prakash had intended for all of the female songs in this film to be given to Geeta Dutt. Then the composer C. Ramchandra took over the project, and insisted not only that all of the female songs be sung by Lata Mangeshkar, but that the Geeta Dutt number also be removed from the film. Although the Filmistan group agreed, the Geeta song stayed in the movie, the famous Aa Jaan-E-Wafa. The lyrics are written by Jan Nissar Akhtar, Shailendra, Rajendra Krishan, Hasrat Jaipuri.

Box office
In India, it was the top-grossing film of 1953, grossing . This is equivalent o  adjusted for inflation in 2016.

Notes

References

External links
 
Anarkali (1953 film) on Complete Index To World Film (CITWF) website

1953 films
1950s historical drama films
1950s Hindi-language films
Indian films based on plays
Indian historical drama films
Films set in the 16th century
Films set in the Mughal Empire
Films scored by C. Ramchandra
Cultural depictions of Akbar
Cultural depictions of Jahangir
1953 drama films
Indian black-and-white films
Films about courtesans in India